Deniskino is a rural locality (a selo) and the administrative centre of Deniskinsky Selsoviet, Fyodorovsky District, Bashkortostan, Russia. The population was 637 as of 2010. There are 14 streets.

Geography 
Deniskino is located 23 km south of Fyodorovka (the district's administrative centre) by road. Novomikhaylovka is the nearest rural locality.

References 

Rural localities in Fyodorovsky District